Ditya Bhande (born 15 November 2006) is an Indian dancer and actress. She is the winner of the kids dance reality television show Super Dancer Season 1. She made her acting debut in the Tamil musical film Lakshmi. This film was written and directed by A. L. Vijay, starring Prabhu Deva and Aishwarya Rajesh. She acted as a schoolgirl who loves dance.
She is a member of I Am Hip Hop kids crew. She also participated in Dance India Dance Season 7.

Filmography

Awards 

 Super Dancer Season 1 title winner

References 



Living people
2006 births